Valter Silva do Nascimento (born 24 January 1975) is a retired Brazilian football striker.

References

1975 births
Living people
Brazilian footballers
F.C. Paços de Ferreira players
Lusitânia F.C. players
C.F. União de Lamas players
Académico de Viseu F.C. players
SC São João de Ver players
GD Beira-Mar players
S.C. Pombal players
S.C. Dragões Sandinenses players
U.D. Oliveirense players
G.D. Peniche players
S.C. Freamunde players
Association football forwards
Primeira Liga players
Brazilian expatriate footballers
Expatriate footballers in Portugal
Brazilian expatriate sportspeople in Portugal
Sportspeople from Salvador, Bahia